Aaron Sigmond is an American author, editor and publisher with a focus on luxury heritage brands.

Magazine and publishing career
Sigmond moved from Los Angeles to New York City to pursue a career in magazine publishing. He created and launched the cigar lifestyle periodical Smoke magazine. Along the way he became a recognized authority on cigars, wine and spirits. Sigmond worked his way up to become Group Publisher of Profile Pursuit, focusing on custom publishing for clients such as Crunch Fitness and publisher of Radar. Among his other work in custom media was Trump Magazine, a glossy published with Donald Trump. Sigmond was most recently Editor-in-Chief of Mechanics of Style, a custom digital men's luxury lifestyle journal for Girard-Perregaux. Sigmond also served as the Group Luxury Editor for DoubleDown Media and was the launch publisher of Radar magazine.

Sigmond unsuccessfully attempted to launch a glossy magazine based on the Suicide Girls.

Writing career

Sigmond has written for publications including Robb Report, Worth, The Big Stage from the NYSE. He also served as contributing editor or senior contributing editor for Playboy, for which he wrote Playboy: The Book of Cigars with Nick Kolakowski. Sigmond is also a noted timepiece writer, having written for both Revolution and aBlogToWatch. He has published two related books: The New Face of Tradition: Young Watch Masters of Girard-Perregaux & The Art of Making Time and the forthcoming Drive Time: Watches Inspired by Automobiles, Motorcycles and Racing (Rizzoli, 2016), with a foreword by car and watch collector Jay Leno.

Works

  (Foreword)
 
 
  (Foreword)
 
  (Forthcoming. Foreword by Jay Leno.)

References

External
 
 Personal blog, SIGnature

Living people
American male writers
American children's writers
American editors
American publishers (people)
Year of birth missing (living people)